This list covers all passenger railway stations and halts in the Rhineland-Palatinate that are served by scheduled services.

Description 

This list is organised as follows:

 Name: current name of the station or halt.
 Urban/Rural county (Kreis): This columns gives the rural county or urban district in which the station is located. The abbreviations for these are given below and correspond to the German number plate scheme:

 Ahrweiler (AW)
 Altenkirchen (Westerwald) (AK)
 Alzey-Worms (AZ)
 Landkreis Bad Dürkheim (DÜW)
 Bad Kreuznach (KH)
 Bernkastel-Wittlich (WIL)
 Birkenfeld (BIR)
 Cochem-Zell (COC)
 Donnersbergkreis (KIB)
 Eifelkreis Bitburg-Prüm (BIT)
 Frankenthal (Pfalz) (FT)
 Germersheim (GER)
 Kaiserslautern (district) and Kaiserslautern (KL)
 Koblenz (KO)
 Kusel (KUS)
 Landau in der Pfalz (LD)
 Ludwigshafen am Rhein (LU)
 Mainz-Bingen and Mainz (MZ)
 Mayen-Koblenz (MYK)
 Neustadt an der Weinstrasse (NW)
 Neuwied (NR)
 Rhein-Hunsrück-Kreis (SIM)
 Rhein-Lahn-Kreis (EMS)
 Rhein-Pfalz-Kreis (RP)
 Speyer (SP)
 Südliche Weinstrasse (SÜW)
 Südwestpfalz and Pirmasens (PS)
 Trier-Saarburg and Trier (TR)
 Vulkaneifel (DAU)
 Westerwaldkreis (WW)
 Worms (WO)
 Zweibrücken (ZW)

 Railway operator: The state of Rhineland-Palatinate is covered by six railway operators. The counties of Altenkirchen (Westerwald) and the neighbouring Westerwaldkreis are the only ones not served by regional railway operators. In Altenkirchen (Westerwald) however transit fares are available for travelling to and from the main networks of the Verkehrsverbund Rhein-Sieg and Zweckverband Personennahverkehr Westfalen Süd.
 Karlsruher Verkehrsverbund (KVV)
 Rhein-Main-Verkehrsverbund (RMV)
 Rhein-Nahe-Nahverkehrsverbund (RNN)
 Verkehrsverbund Rhein-Mosel (VRM)
 Verkehrsverbund Rhein-Neckar (VRN)
 Verkehrsverbund Region Trier (VRT)
 Cat: The Cat column shows the current categories of stations as at  1 January 2013. This only applies to DB Station&Service stations and does not include stations run by private operators like the Westerwaldbahn (WEG).
 The five remaining columns show which types of train serve the station. The abbreviations are those used by the DB AG, but apply to similar train types from the other operators:
 ICE – Intercity-Express
 IC – IC and EC
 RE – Regional-Express
 RB – Regionalbahn
 S – S-Bahn und Stadtbahn Karlsruhe¹
¹ Stations on the Rhein-Haardtbahn are not included due to the tramway-like character of the route.
 Line – This column gives the railway on which the station is located. Only those routes which are still in operation are named.
 Remarks – In this column is additional information, particularly with regard to railway operators and remarks about seasonal services.

Station overview

See also 
German railway station categories
Railway station types of Germany
List of scheduled railway routes in Germany

Notes

External links 
 Online timetable of DB services* Schedule services in Rhineland-Palatinate (pdf file, 5.40 MB)

 
Rhineland-Palatinate
Rail